SS Manistee was an Elders & Fyffes Ltd banana boat that was launched in 1920. She was one of a numerous class of similar banana boats built for Elders & Fyffes in the 1920s.

In 1940 the British Admiralty requisitioned Manistee and had her converted into an ocean boarding vessel. She was a convoy escort in the Battle of the Atlantic until a U-boat sank her in 1941. None of her 141 crew survived.

She was the second of four Elders & Fyffes ships called Manistee. The first was built in 1904 and sunk by a U-boat in 1917. The third was built in 1932 as Eros, bought in 1946 and renamed Manistee, and scrapped in 1960. The fourth was built in 1972, transferred out of the Elders & Fyffes fleet in 1983, renamed Fleet Wave in 1984 and Mimoza in 1990.

Building
Cammell Laird launched Manistee in Birkenhead on 28 October 1920 and completed her in January 1921. She was the third of 16 similar banana boats launched for Elders & Fyffes between 1919 and 1929. Ten were built by Cammell Laird, two by Workman, Clark in Belfast and four by Alexander Stephen and Sons in Glasgow.

Her holds had  of refrigerated cargo space.

Manistees navigation equipment included submarine signalling and wireless direction finding. In 1934 an echo sounding device was added, and the call sign GDCX superseded her code letters KLBH.

Civilian service
Elders & Fyffes' main route was from Central America and Jamaica to Bristol. It also served Avonmouth, Liverpool, Swansea, Barbados, Trinidad, Panama and Costa Rica. Elders & Fyffes ships carried mail, general cargo and first class passengers as well as bananas.

For the first year of the Second World War Manistee remained in merchant service. Between October 1939 and August 1940 she made trips from Britain to Jamaica, Santa Marta in Colombia, Freetown in Sierra Leone, Cameroon, and Sydney, Nova Scotia.

On 7 July 1940 Manistee was in the Southwest Approaches southwest of Ireland, returning unescorted from Cameroon, when  fired one torpedo at her. It missed, so U-99 surfaced and opened fire with her 88 mm deck gun. Manistee returned fire with her DEMS armament. Neither vessel scored any hits, and U-99 broke off the attack.

Naval service
The Admiralty requisitioned Manistee on 14 September 1940. She was armed with two QF 6-inch naval guns, one QF 12-pounder 12 cwt naval gun and one anti-aircraft gun. In December 1940 she was commissioned into the Royal Navy with pennant number F 104. Her commander was Lt Cdr Eric Haydn Smith, RNR.

HMS Manistee was one of the escorts of Convoy OB 288, which left Liverpool on 18 February 1941. OB 288 dispersed in the North Atlantic at 2100 hours on 23 February northwest of Ireland and south of Iceland due to U-boat activity in the area. At 2242 (Berlin Time) the  fired two torpedoes at Manistee at position . One hit her in the engine room. At 2256 hrs the  fired torpedoes at Manistee, and claimed that one hit her stern.

Manistee stayed afloat, so at 2258 hrs U-107 fired at her again, but missed as Manistee got under way again. At 2342 hrs U-107 fired a torpedo from one of her stern tubes, which also missed. Manistee made  and zig-zagged as U-107 chased her through the night. At 0758 hrs U-107 fired two more torpedoes, one of which hit Manistees stern and sank her.

The destroyer , corvette  and Free French destroyer  were sent to search for survivors, but none of her 141 crew was found.

References

Bibliography

1920 ships
Maritime incidents in February 1941
Ships built on the River Mersey
Ships lost with all hands
Ships sunk by German submarines in World War II
Steamships of the United Kingdom
World War II merchant ships of the United Kingdom
World War II naval ships of the United Kingdom
World War II shipwrecks in the Atlantic Ocean